The 1965–66 Football League Cup was the sixth season of the Football League Cup, a knockout competition for England's top 92 football clubs; only 83 of them competed. The competition ended with the two-legged final on 9 and 23 March 1966.

Match dates and results were initially drawn from Soccerbase, and they were later checked against Rothmans Football Yearbook 1970–71.

Calendar
Of the 83 teams, 45 received a bye to the second round and the other 38 played in the first round; these were the teams ranked 55th–92nd in the 1964–65 Football League. Semi-finals and final were two-legged.

First round

Ties

Replays

Second round

Ties

Replays

Third round

Ties

Replays

Fourth round

Ties

Replays

Fifth round

Ties

Replays

Semifinals

First Leg

Second Leg

Final

West Ham United: Standen, Burnett, Burkett, Peters, Brown, Moore, Brabrook, Boyce, Byrne, Hurst, Dear

West Bromwich Albion: Potter, Cram, Fairfax, Fraser, Campbell, Williams, Brown, Astle, Kaye, Lovett, Clark

West Bromwich Albion: Potter, Cram, Fairfax, Fraser, Campbell, Williams, Brown, Astle, Kaye, Hope, Clark

West Ham United: Standen, Burnett, Peters, Bovington, Brown, Moore, Brabrook, Boyce, Byrne, Hurst, Sissons

West Bromwich Albion win 5–3 on aggregate.

References

General

Specific

									
									
									

1965–66
1965–66 domestic association football cups
Lea
Cup